is a Japanese company which produces rubber and other synthetic resin products.

In June 2014, the company changed its corporate name from Tokai Rubber Industries to Sumitomo Riko to clarify that it is a part of the Sumitomo Group.

Through its subsidiaries in 24 countries, the company claims to hold the largest market share of automotive anti-vibration products. Automotive products account for nearly 80 percent of sales.

Business segments and products

Automotive products
Anti-vibration rubber components
Sound controlling and insulation products
Automotive hoses
Modular parts

IT-related products
Office automation equipment components
Precision anti-vibration rubber products

Industrial products
Hydraulic hoses
Rubber hoses

Infrastructure application products
Anti-vibration rubber for railway vehicles
Anti-vibration rubber for industrial machinery
Seismic isolation bearings for bridges

Construction and housing products
Earthquake countermeasures: dampers
Countermeasures to traffic and other vibrations in the living environment
Energy-saving products

See also
 Anvis Group

References

External links 
 Main Corporate Site 

Automotive companies of Japan
Manufacturing companies of Japan
Companies based in Aichi Prefecture
Companies listed on the Tokyo Stock Exchange
Companies listed on the Nagoya Stock Exchange
Manufacturing companies established in 1929
1929 establishments in Japan
Sumitomo Group